Tayshet Railway station is a passenger railway station for the city of Tayshet in Russia. This station belongs to Trans-Siberian Railway, and it is the origin station of Baikal–Amur Mainline.

Trains
 Moscow — Vladivostok
 Moscow — Beijing
 Moscow — Ulaanbaatar
 Novosibirsk — Vladivostok
 Moscow — Khabarovsk
 Novosibirsk — Neryungri
 Moscow — Ulan Ude
 Adler — Irkutsk
 Adler — Chita

References

Railway stations in Irkutsk Oblast
Trans-Siberian Railway
Railway stations in the Russian Empire opened in 1899